The Authuile Military Cemetery is a cemetery located in the Somme region of France commemorating British and Commonwealth soldiers who fought in the First World War. The cemetery contains soldiers who died on a variety of dates in several battles near the French village of Authuile.

Location 
The cemetery is located on the south side of the village of Authile, approximately 5 km north of Albert, France.

Conflict near Authuile 

The village was destroyed by shell fire while under the control of the British from summer 1915 to March 1918, when it was captured in the German Offensive on the Somme. It was used by the British from August 1915 to December 1916, and from 1917 to 1918 by Indian Labour Companies.

Establishment of the cemetery

History 
The cemetery was used by field ambulances and fighting units from August 1915 to December 1916 and in 1917 and 1918 by Indian Labor Companies. Two German soldiers have been removed from the cemetery since burial.

Statistics 
Of the 472 graves in the cemetery, 435 are identified and approximately 40 are unidentified. Special memorials are dedicated to 18 British soldiers known to be buried among the unknown. The cemetery covers an area of 2650 square meters and is enclosed by a concrete curb.

References 

World War I cemeteries in France